IGDA is an acronym referring to the International Game Developers Association.

IGDA may also refer to:

 Interstitial granulomatous dermatitis with arthritis, a skin condition
 Idgah, Uttar Pradesh, a location in India

See also 
 IDGAF (disambiguation)
 Idgah (disambiguation)